Anisha Singh is an Indian businesswoman and founder of She Capital, a female focused venture capital. She is also the founder  and former CEO of Mydala.

Anisha Singh is one of the mentors of Startup India programme, an initiative of the Government of India.

Education and career 
Anisha did her MA and MBA from American University, Washington DC. She started her career as a Strategic Alliance Manager for a software company in the United States. Additionally, she collaborated with the Clinton administration on the Springboard project, which assisted female entrepreneurs in raising money. Later she came back to India and founded a digital technology content company called Kinis Software Solutions.

She established Mydala in 2009, a local services marketing platform with 100+ cities in India and the United Arab Emirates.

Anisha founded SheCapital in 2018, an early-stage fund that invests in businesses run by or with a focus on women.

Anisha Singh is a noted keynote speaker. She has spoken on woman related topics at various noted events like Mobile World Congress Shanghai, Global Mobile Internet Conference Beijing, Seedstars Asia Summit Thailand 2017, TEDx IIM Indore, One Globe Conference, London Tech Week 2021, India Unlimited Sweden 2016 to name a few.

In Popular Culture 
Anisha Singh is the president of the jury of the Cartier Women's Initiative Awards for the South Asia-Oceania region. She was also a judge in MTV's reality show MTV Dropout Pvt Ltd..

Anisha's entrepreneurial journey has been mentioned in a few books such as "Female Innovators at Work: Women on Top of Tech" by Danielle Newnham, "Super Women, Inspiring Stories of 20 Women Entrepreneurs" by Prachi Garg and "Dare to Be: 14 Fearless Women Who Gave Wings to Their Dreams" by Rinku Paul.

Awards 
Anisha was recognized as one of The Top 100 Global Diversity Leaders in 2020
Champions of Change 2017
50 Most Influential 2018 under the Business category in Women in Asia

References

External links 
 Anisha Singh on Slush Event

Indian business executives
Living people
Indian chief operating officers
Year of birth missing (living people)